Bradypnea is abnormally slow breathing. The respiratory rate at which bradypnea is diagnosed depends on the age of the person, with the limit higher during childhood.

Age ranges
 Age 0–1 year  < 30 breaths per minute
 Age 1–3 years < 25 breaths per minute
 Age 3–12 years < 20 breaths per minute
 Age 12–50 years < 12 breaths per minute
 Age 50 and up <13 breaths per minute

Signs and symptoms
Dizziness
Near-fainting (drowsiness) or fainting
Fatigue
Weakness   
Chest pains
Shortness of breath
Memory impairment or confusion
Tiring easily during any physical activity

Causes
Degeneration of heart tissue because of aging
Damage to tissues in the heart from heart attack, heart disease or injury
High blood pressure or hypertension
Congenital heart defect which is a permanent disorder present at birth
Heart tissue infection also known as myocarditis -Complication of heart surgery
Hypothyroidism or an underactive thyroid gland
Imbalance of electrolytes which are mineral related substances needed for conducting electrical impulses
Obstructive sleep apnea which is the repeated disruption of breathing during sleep due to obstruction to the airway
Inflammatory disease, such as lupus or rheumatic fever
Buildup of iron in the organs known as hemochromatosis
Medications, such as drugs for other heart rhythm disorders as well as high blood pressure and narcotic pain medications may also decrease respiratory rate
Dysautonomia (dysfunction of the autonomic nervous system)

Treatment
If urgent treatment is needed, supplemental oxygen is given to the individual. Treatments can range from surgery to correct dangerous intracranial pressure, to stays in rehabilitation facilities for bradypnea caused by addiction problems.

Etymology and pronunciation
The word bradypnea uses combining forms of brady- + -pnea, from (Greek from bradys, slow + pnoia, breath. 
See pronunciation information at dyspnea.

See also

List of terms of lung size and activity
Respiratory rate
Tachypnea

References

External links 

Breathing abnormalities